San Basilio Vescovo is a Roman Catholic parish church located on Via Trieste in the town of Grontardo in the province of Cremona, region of Lombardy, Italy.

History
The whole church, except the choir, was rebuilt in a Neoclassical-style in 1840. It houses an altarpiece by one of the painters of the family of Sigismondo Benini.

References

Churches in the province of Cremona
19th-century Roman Catholic church buildings in Italy